The Bangladesh National Film Award for Best Editing is one of the highest film awards in Bangladesh. Since 1977, the awards are given in the category of best Editing. The first award winner was Bashir Hossain. Mujibur Rahman Dulu was awarded 8 times and Aminul Islam Mintu was awarded 4 times.

List of winners

1970s

1980s

1990s

2000s

2010s

Statistics

Winner more than once

8 times
 Mujibur Rahman Dulu

4 times
 Aminul Islam Mintu

 3 times
 Junaid Halim

2 times
 Bashir Hossain
 Atikur Rahman Mallick
 Jinnat Hossain
 Saiful Islam

References

External links

 Official website

Editing
National Film Awards (Bangladesh)